Jewel orchid is a common name which may refer to any orchid grown for its leaves rather than its flowers, including:
Anoectochilus
Anoectochilus sandvicensis, Hawaii jewel orchid
Dossinia
Goodyera
Ludisia
Ludisia discolor, jewel orchid
Macodes
Note that these are all in the subtribe Goodyerinae.

See also
Orchidaceae#Leaves